Jovan Lukić may refer to:
 Jovan Lukić (footballer, born 1997), Serbian footballer
 Jovan Lukić (footballer, born 2002), Serbian footballer
 John Lukic (born 1960), English football coach and  footballer

See also
 Jovan Lučić (born 1987), Canadian/Serbian football goalkeeper